Max Rudolf "Rudi" Lemberg FRS FAA (19 October 1896 – 10 April 1975) was a German-Australian biochemist who specialised in porphyrin structure and function. He was a Foundation Fellow of the Australian Academy of Science (FAA).

He was a director of the Kolling Institute of Medical Research from 1935 to 1972, establishing a major research focus on porphyrins, structures within molecules which give the red colour to blood and the yellow colour to bile.

He applied for naturalization as an Australian citizen in 1937.

Rudi Lemberg Travelling Fellowship
The Rudi Lemberg Travelling Fellowship offered by the Academy is named in his honour.

Awardees:
 2018 – Christina A. Kellogg
 2016 – L.J. Berliner
 2012 – P. Jones
 2010 – J. Deisenhofer
 2008 — John F. Allen
 2006 – J. Vymazal
 2004 – G.C. Dismukes
 2002 – P. Fromme; R.N. Perham
 2001 – D.M.J.S. Bowman
 1999 – V.L. Schramm
 1997 – M.D. Brand
 1996 — T.F. Flannery
 1993 – W.R. Briggs
 1992 – E.M. Kosower
 1991 – R. Huber
 1990 – J. Porath
 1989 – M.L. Rosenzweig
 1986 – H. Scheer
 1985 – M.G. Rossmann
 1984 – O.T.G. Jones
 1983 – J. Heslop-Harrison
 1982 – W.K. Joklik
 1981 – E. Margoliash; P.H. Raven
 1980 – L.E. Mortenson; G.J.V. Nossal
 1979 – B. Chance; J.B. Gurdon; G.S. Stent

References

1896 births
1975 deaths
Australian biochemists
German emigrants to Australia
Fellows of the Australian Academy of Science
Fellows of the Royal Society
Place of birth missing